von Krockow is a surname. Notable people with the surname include:

Anton von Krockow (1714–1778), Prussian lieutenant general
Christian Graf von Krockow (1927–2002), German writer and political scientist
Peter von Krockow (born 1935), German fencer
Milla von Krockow (born 1986/1987), German fashion model